Diawara may refer to:

Place
Diawara, Senegal

People with the surname
Diawara is the French transcription of a surname of Manding origin (the English transcription is Jawara).  Notable people with this name include:

Abdoulaye Diawara (born 1981), Ivorian footballer
Abdoulaye Diawara (footballer born 1983) (born 1983), French-born Malian footballer, brother of Fousseni and Samba
Abdourahamane Diawara (born 1978), Guinean swimmer
Amadou Diawara (born 1997), Guinean footballer
Ange Diawara (1941–1973), Congolese politician and military figure
Baba Diawara (born 1988), Senegalese football striker
Daba Diawara (born 1951), Malian politician
Diéné Diawara (born 1988), Malian basketball player, sister of Lamine and Nare
Djeli Moussa Diawara (aka Jali Musa Jawara; born 1962), a Guinean musician
Djibril Diawara (born 1975), French-Senagalese footballer
Fatoumata Diawara (born 1982), Malian folk musician
Fousseni Diawara (born 1980), French-born Malian footballer, brother of Abdoulaye and Samba
Kaba Diawara (born 1975), French-born Guinean footballer
Lamine Diawara (born 1971), Malian basketball player, brother of Diéné and Nare
Mamadou Diawara (born 1989), French footballer
Manthia Diawara, Malian professor of comparative literature
Nare Diawara (born 1983), Malian basketball player, sister of Diéné and Lamine
Samba Diawara (born 1978), Malian footballer, brother of Abdoulaye and Fousseni
Souleymane Diawara (born 1978), Senegalese football defender
Yakhouba Diawara (born 1982), French basketball player in the National Basketball Association

Mandinka surnames